Silencio=Muerte: Red Hot + Latin, The tenth entry in the Red Hot Benefit Series of compilation albums, takes a post-modern look at the contemporary rock en Español scene. This compilation features music from Spanish, Pan-American, as well non-Latin/Anglo-American acts that have either transformed the sounds and images of Latin music or have been influenced by the same.

As with other entries in the series, this project tailors its AIDS-awareness message to a specific target. Here, the focus is on the rapidly expanding epidemic of AIDS in Latin America.

Upon its release in 1997, Silencio=Muerte peaked at #14 and #48 on Billboard'''s Latin pop and Top Latin Albums, respectively.

The album was re-issued by Nacional Records in 2006 as Red Hot + Latin Redux'', including new bonus tracks.

Track listing 
"Pepe and Irene", performed by Los Lobos + Money Mark – 3:33
"Yolanda Nigüas (Yolanda Nigüas)", performed by Café Tacvba + David Byrne – 3:24
"Gente Que No (Are They Not People)", performed by Todos Tus Muertos + Auténticos Decadentes – 4:13
"What's New Pussycat? (Que hay de nuevo, cariño?)", performed by Los Fabulosos Cadillacs + Fishbone – 4:13
"El Son Del Dolor (Tune of Pain )", performed by Cuca + Youth Brigade – 4:03
"Wanna Be Loved (Desea ser Amado)", performed by Los Pericos + Buju Banton – 4:07
"Quien Es Ese Negro (Who Is That Black One)", performed by Sen Dog, Mellow Man Ace, MC Skeey + Mr. Rico + DJ Rif – 4:42
"Padre Nuestro (Our Father)", performed by Reign + Hurricane G – 3:37
"Historia De La Radio (History Of The Radio)", performed by Juan Perro – 4:27
"Quien Quiera Que Seas (Whoever You Are)", performed by Geggy Tah + King Changó – 4:15
"Águas De Março (Waters of March)", performed by Cibo Matto – 3:18
"Una Hoja, Una Raiz (One Leaf, One Root)", performed by Diego Frenkel (La Portuária), Aterciopelados + Laurie Anderson – 4:01
"No Te Miento (I Don't Lie [to you])", performed by Rubén Blades + Son Miserables – 4:29
"Sin Tener A Donde Ir (Nowhere to Go)", performed by Melissa Etheridge – 4:15
"Cosas Que Me Ayudan A Olvidar (Things That Help Me To Forget)", performed by Andrés Calamaro – 3:57
"You Come And Go (Usted Viene Y Va)", performed by La Ley – 5:18
"Venas (Veins)", performed by Victimas Del Doctor Cerebro – 4:15
"War (Guerra)", performed by Sepultura – 4:32

Track listing Red Hot + Latin Redux (2006)
"Pepe and Irene" performed by Los Lobos + Money Mark
"Yolanda Nigüas" performed by Café Tacvba + David Byrne
"Gente Que No" performed by Todos Tus Muertos + Auténticos Decadentes
"What's New Pussycat?" performed by Los Fabulosos Cadillacs + Fishbone
"El Son Del Dolor" performed by Cuca + Youth Brigade
"Wanna Be Loved (Desea ser Amado)", performed by Los Pericos + Buju Banton
"Quien Es Ese Negro (Who Is That Black One)", performed by Sen Dog, Mellow Man Ace, MC Skeey + Mr. Rico + DJ Rif
"Padre Nuestro (Our Father)", performed by Reign + Hurricane G
"Quien Quiera Que Seas (Whoever You Are)", performed by Geggy Tah + King Changó
"Águas De Março (Waters of March)", performed by Cibo Matto
"Una Hoja, Una Raiz (One Leaf, One Root)", performed by Diego Frenkel (La Portuária), Aterciopelados + Laurie Anderson
"Cosas Que Me Ayudan A Olvidar (Things That Help Me To Forget)", performed by Andrés Calamaro
"Que Bonita Bailas" performed by Nortec Collective *
"Peligroso Pop" performed by Plastilina Mosh *
"Sol Tapado" performed by Thievery Corporation *
"Sister Twisted" - Kinky  *
"Crosseyed And Painless" - Brazilian Girls *
 * = New bonus tracks.

See also
Red Hot Organization

External links
VOX Magazine review

References

Red Hot Organization albums
1997 compilation albums
Albums produced by Domingo (producer)